Nikolai Semashko may refer to:

 Nikolai Semashko (medicine) (1874–1949), Soviet medicine organizer and politician
 Nikolai Semashko (basketball) (1907–1976), Soviet sports administrator